is a Japanese tarento, fashion model, singer and voice actress. She is a former member and leader of Dream5. She is nicknamed . She is currently represented with Gold.

Filmography

Variety

Radio

TV dramas

Films

Dubbing

Anime television

Anime films

Video games

Advertisements

Magazine serialisations

References

External links
 
 – Ameba Blog 

Japanese television personalities
Japanese female models
Japanese child actresses
Japanese voice actresses
Avex Group artists
1996 births
Living people
Actors from Tokushima Prefecture
Voice actors from Tokushima Prefecture
Models from Tokushima Prefecture